The Baden Class III b engines were German steam locomotives designed for hauling passenger trains for the Grand Duchy of Baden State Railway (Großherzoglich Badische Staatseisenbahn).
In this class the Baden state railway grouped rebuilt locomotives of former classes III and III a. 

Seventy engines of Baden classes III and III a were rebuilt between 1881 and 1891. They were all given a new, more powerful, three-ring boiler with a larger grate area. Because this was longer than the original boilers, the frame of the Class III had to be extended (on the Class IIIa it was long enough) and a buffer beam built onto the front. 

The boiler had a Belpaire firebox with a somewhat higher top surface. A larger steam dome was fitted on top of the rear boiler ring.

Further reading 
  Lokomotiv-Archiv Baden, Hermann Lohr, Georg Thielmann, transpress Berlin, 1988, pp 82–88.

See also
Grand Duchy of Baden State Railway
List of Baden locomotives and railbuses

4-4-0 locomotives
03 b
Standard gauge locomotives of Germany
Railway locomotives introduced in 1881
2′B n2 locomotives
Passenger locomotives